USS S-6 (SS-111) was a second-group ( or "Government") S-class submarine of the United States Navy. Her keel was laid down on 29 January 1918 by the Portsmouth Navy Yard. She was launched on 23 December 1919 sponsored by Ms. Eleanor Westcott; and commissioned on 17 May 1920.

Following trials and outfitting, S-6 departed New London, Connecticut on 18 November 1920, and joined other S-boats of Submarine Divisions 12 and 18 (SubDivs 12 and 18) for what was to be — at that time — the longest cruise for American submarines on record. The trip — begun with a rendezvous off Portsmouth, New Hampshire — took them through the Panama Canal, to Pearl Harbor and then to Cavite, Luzon, Philippine Islands. Other submarines had operated out of Cavite prior to this, but they had been transported there on the decks of colliers.

The two submarine divisions operated from Cavite over the next three years, from 1 December 1921 – 29 October 1924. During that time, they frequently visited the Chinese ports at Shanghai, Chefoo, Chinwangtao, Tsingtao, Amoy, and Woosung.

On 30 December, S-6 and SubDiv 12 arrived at Mare Island, California. They operated along the West Coast until 15 February 1927; in the Panama Canal area in March–April; then returned to New London on 3 May to operate along the New England coast. S-6 then served as a training model to familiarize divers preparing to raise the sunken sub. S-4 was raised on 17 March 1928 and S-6 resumed normal operations with her division. She conducted winter maneuvers in the Panama Canal area in 1929-1930, but primarily operated out of New London until decommissioned on 10 April 1931, at Philadelphia, Pennsylvania. She was struck from the Naval Vessel Register on 25 January 1937.

References

United States S-class submarines
Ships built in Kittery, Maine
1919 ships